Pittwater Park is a rugby stadium in Warriewood, New South Wales, Australia. It is located 500 metres from North Narrabeen beach within the reserve of the area. The park is more colloquially known as Rat Park being named after the Warringah Rugby Club whose official mascot is a rat.

The ground was established in 1971, over the years, basic facilities have been added, such as the 1,000-seat grandstand, clubhouse, and training field. Lights have also been installed on the main field.

It is mainly used for rugby union and has been the home ground of the Warringah Rugby Club since 1975.  The stadium has a capacity of 6,000.

See also

List of rugby league stadiums by capacity
List of rugby union stadiums by capacity

References

External links
 North Narrabeen Reserve - Pittwater Rugby Park Northern Beaches Council

Soccer venues in Sydney
Rugby league stadiums in Australia
Rugby union stadiums in Australia
Sports venues in Sydney